The following is a complete list of home media releases related to the British ITV (TV network) of the police drama series The Bill.

DVDs

United Kingdom

Australia
Via Vision Entertainment has acquired the rights to the series and will begin releasing the series. Series 1–4 on 16 September 2020, Series 5 and 6 on 21 October 2020, Series 7 and 8 on 18 November 2020.

United States

VHS

United Kingdom

Australia

Online

iTunes
On 23 November 2011 Shock Entertainment started making some of its The Bill DVD release available to purchase through iTunes (Australia Store only), all releases are below.

YouTube
On 19 March 2013, Fremantle Media began uploading episodes of The Bill onto video-sharing website YouTube. Currently, the first five episodes of the first series are available, with a banner displayed, stating that there are "more episodes coming soon."

Spin off shows

Burnside DVD

Murder Investigation Team DVD

References

Home video releases
Bill, The